Nathan Huff Miller (born July 4, 1943) is a Virginia lawyer and political figure.  A Republican, he served in both houses of the Virginia General Assembly.  He is currently the managing partner of Harrisonburg law firm Miller, Earle & Shanks.

Background
Miller was born in Rockingham County and graduated from Bridgewater College and T.C. Williams School of Law of the University of Richmond. He is a member of the Church of the Brethren, Bridgewater Rotary Club, Harrisonburg Jaycees and Rockingham Male Chorus. He previously served as a judge of the Timberville Municipal Court.

Political career 

Nathan Miller and fellow Republican attorney Clinton Miller were first elected to the Virginia House of Delegates in 1971. They succeeded Republicans Don E. Earman and Donald K. Funkhouser. Nathan Miller served two terms as delegate (1972-1975).

In 1975 he won election to the Virginia State Senate, defeating incumbent Democrat George S. Aldhizer to represent the 26th District, which included Culpeper, Madison, Page, Rappahannock and Rockingham Counties, as well as the City of Harrisonburg, where he served (in the also part-time position) from 1976 until 1984. He defeated Democrat W.E. Schlabach in 1975, whom his successor, fellow Republican and former delegate Kevin G. Miller (a retired accounting professor) defeated in 1979.

Miller ran for the Virginia Republican nomination for the U.S. Senate in 1978, but lost to John W. Warner, who won the general election. Nathan Miller became the Republican nominee for Lieutenant Governor of Virginia in 1981, but lost the general election to Richard Joseph Davis, Democratic State Chairman and mayor of Portsmouth, Virginia.

References 

Living people
1943 births
Place of birth missing (living people)
Bridgewater College alumni
Republican Party Virginia state senators
Republican Party members of the Virginia House of Delegates
20th-century American politicians
University of Richmond alumni
People from Rockingham County, Virginia
Candidates in the 1978 United States elections
20th-century American lawyers
21st-century American lawyers
Virginia lawyers